Marybeth Sant-Price (born April 6, 1995) is an American track and field sprinter. She holds personal records of 10.95 over 100m and 7.04 over 60 metres.

Sant-Price won a bronze medal at the 2022 World Athletics Indoor Championships – Women's 60 metres in Belgrade, Serbia.

Professional

Personal bests
Outdoor
100 m: 10.95 (2021)
200 m: 23.46 (2019)

Indoor
60 m: 7.04 (2022)
200 m: 23.47 (2019)

NCAA
Marybeth Sant-Price is a 3-time NCAA Division 1 All-American, Mountain West Conference champion, 5-time All-Mountain West Conference, & 2-time Pacific-12 Conference.

High school

References

External links
World Athletics Bio

Living people
1995 births
World Athletics Championships athletes for the United States
World Athletics Indoor Championships medalists
American female sprinters
Track and field athletes from Colorado
Oregon Ducks women's track and field athletes
Sportspeople from Denver
Colorado State Rams women's track and field athletes
University of Oregon alumni
Colorado State University alumni